Devon Key (born October 28, 1997) is an American football defensive back for the Denver Broncos of the National Football League (NFL). He played college football for Western Kentucky and was signed by the Kansas City Chiefs as an undrafted free agent following the 2021 NFL Draft.

Early life and education
Devon Key was born on October 28, 1997, in Lexington, Kentucky. He attended Bryan Station High School there, playing on offense and defense. He was rated a two-star prospect by Rivals.com, 247sports.com, and Scout.com. Following his senior year of high school Key accepted a scholarship offer from Western Kentucky University, spending his first year of 2016 as a redshirt.

As a redshirt-freshman the following year, Key was starting safety to begin the season, making 94 tackles (44 solo, 50 assisted) to rank second on his team and 16th in the conference. He recorded at least nine tackles in five different games. He made his first-career interception in the end zone on November 11 at Marshall. He had a career-high 12 tackles on September 9 at Illinois.

He started all 12 games as a sophomore, compiling 71 tackles to lead the team's defensive backs. He also recorded a team-leading three interceptions. His first interception, against Maine, was returned for a 45 yard touchdown. Key also made interceptions during the final two season games. Following the season he was named All-Conference USA honorable mention.

Key started 13 games as a junior, making 93 tackles, third on the team. He recorded his second career interception return touchdown against Arkansas in November. He again was named All-Conference USA honorable mention. He again started every game during his senior season, breaking the FBS-era team record for career tackles, with 350. He finished the year with 92 tackles, one less than the previous year. He was named second-team All-Conference USA following the season.

Professional career

Kansas City Chiefs
After going unselected in the 2021 NFL Draft, Key was signed by the Kansas City Chiefs as an undrafted free agent. He was released at roster cuts and signed to the practice squad the next day. He signed a reserve/future contract with the Chiefs on February 2, 2022.

On August 30, 2022, Key was waived by the Chiefs.

Atlanta Falcons
On November 15, 2022, Key was signed to the Atlanta Falcons practice squad. He was released from the practice squad a week later.

Denver Broncos
On December 20, 2022, Key was signed to the Denver Broncos practice squad. He signed a reserve/future contract on January 9, 2023.

Personal life
Key's father, Donte, played for the University of Kentucky.  His younger brother, Dane, plays as a wide receiver at the University of Kentucky.  Key and his girlfriend welcomed a son in August 2020.

References

External links
Kansas City Chiefs profile

1997 births
Players of American football from Kentucky
American football defensive backs
Living people
Western Kentucky Hilltoppers football players
Kansas City Chiefs players
Atlanta Falcons players
Denver Broncos players